Dumfoyn is a hill in the Campsie Fells of Scotland. It sits beside another hill, Dumgoyne which is a popular ascent for walkers due to its close proximity to Glasgow.

Volcanic plugs of Scotland